Wesley Collins Blogg  (1855–1897) was a 19th-century professional baseball outfielder and catcher.

External links

Major League Baseball outfielders
Major League Baseball catchers
Pittsburgh Alleghenys players
19th-century baseball players
Baseball players from Norfolk, Virginia
1855 births
1897 deaths
Manchester (minor league baseball) players
Johnstown (minor league baseball) players
Dayton Gem Citys players